The 1961–62 Yorkshire Cup was the fifty-fourth occasion on which the  Yorkshire Cup competition had been held.

Wakefield Trinity winning the trophy by beating Leeds by the score of 19-9

The match was played at Odsal in the City of Bradford, now in West Yorkshire. The attendance was 16,329 and receipts were £2,864

This was Wakefield Trinity's second consecutive triumph and the  club's fourth appearance out of five in a period of nine years (which included four as cup winners and one as runner-up)

Background 

This season there were no junior/amateur clubs taking part, no new entrants and no "leavers" and so the total of entries remained the  same at sixteen.

This in turn resulted in no byes in the first round.

Competition and results

Round 1 
Involved  8 matches (with no byes) and 16 clubs

Round 2 - quarterfinals 
Involved 4 matches and 8 clubs

Round 3 – semifinals  
Involved 2 matches and 4 clubs

Final

Teams and scorers 

Scoring - Try = three (3) points - Goal = two (2) points - Drop goal = two (2) points

The road to success

Notes and comments 
1 * This was both the  record score and winning margin at the  time. It also equalled Wakefield Trinity's record score (v Broughton Moor Amat in 1950) - Gerry Round kicked 11 goals to equal the  club record

2 * The attendance is given as 16,429 by "100 Years of Rugby. The History of Wakefield Trinity 1873-1973" and 16,329 by RUGBYLEAGUEproject  and by the  Rothmans Rugby League Yearbook of 1991-92 and 1990-91

3 * The  receipts are quoted as £2,914 by "100 Years of Rugby. The History of Wakefield Trinity 1873-1973" but £2,864 in the  Rothmans Rugby League Yearbook of 1991-92 and 1990-91

4 * Odsal is the home ground of Bradford Northern from 1890 to 2010 and the current capacity is in the region of 26,000, The ground is famous for hosting the largest attendance at an English sports ground when 102,569 (it was reported that over 120,000 actually attended as several areas of boundary fencing collapse under the sheer weight of numbers) attended the replay of the Challenge Cup final on 5 May 1954 to see Halifax v Warrington

General information for those unfamiliar 
The Rugby League Yorkshire Cup competition was a knock-out competition between (mainly professional) rugby league clubs from  the  county of Yorkshire. The actual area was at times increased to encompass other teams from  outside the  county such as Newcastle, Mansfield, Coventry, and even London (in the form of Acton & Willesden.

The Rugby League season always (until the onset of "Summer Rugby" in 1996) ran from around August-time through to around May-time and this competition always took place early in the season, in the Autumn, with the final taking place in (or just before) December (The only exception to this was when disruption of the fixture list was caused during, and immediately after, the two World Wars)

See also 
1961–62 Northern Rugby Football League season
Rugby league county cups

References

External links
Saints Heritage Society
1896–97 Northern Rugby Football Union season at wigan.rlfans.com
Hull&Proud Fixtures & Results 1896/1897
Widnes Vikings - One team, one passion Season In Review - 1896-97
The Northern Union at warringtonwolves.org

1961 in English rugby league
RFL Yorkshire Cup